Todd Barrett Kashdan is an American psychologist. He is a professor of psychology and director of the Well-Being Laboratory at George Mason University. His research explores why people suffer, with an emphasis on the transition from normal to pathological anxiety. Other research explores the nature of well-being, with an emphasis on the critical functions of curiosity, meaning and purpose in life, and psychological flexibility to human performance.

Early life and education
Kashdan received his undergraduate degree from Cornell University in 1996. He conducted research with Arthur Aron at Stony Brook University to identify what character traits drive attraction. While a doctoral student at the University at Buffalo, State University of New York, together with Paul Rose and under the direction of Francis Fincham, he explored how people's curiosity affects their relationships.

Career

Research and findings
Kashdan went on to accept a teaching position at the university and in 2004, together with John Roberts, he studied how curiosity affects the successfulness of a relationship, exploring, for instance, if curious people are more active listeners, if they show more interest, and if they ask more thoughtful questions.
Since 2004, Kashdan has also taught at George Mason University, where he is a tenured professor and leads the Well-Being Laboratory. The lab received a $1 million research grant from the Charles Koch Foundation by 2020.

Kashdan has found that curiosity is key to a "happy, fulfilling life". He states that it helps make even tedious tasks more enjoyable, by focusing on the details and capturing the childlike sense of awe and wonder. He wrote a chapter about how curiosity is a character strength for Character Strengths and Virtues by Christopher Peterson and Martin Seligman. From his research, Kashdan has found that curiosity leads to better performance, because curious people are more open to learning and are more engaged.

He has also found that people who practice gratitude are better able to interact with others in their work and personal lives, because they are more likely to be more considerate of other people and less aggressive in response to insults.

Kashdan has found that losing one's job can affect a person for several years, because even after they get a new job, they wonder how long it will be until they lose that job. It is less disturbing, though, if the person was part of a mass layoff than if they were the only person let go.

Recognition
Kashdan received the American Psychological Association's 2013 Distinguished Scientific Early Career Award. He has been an associate editor for the Journal of Personality and Social Psychology, Journal of Personality, and Journal of Positive Psychology.

Controversy
In 2019, Kashdan was chastised by George Mason University for "lack of appropriate professional behavior" and gender-based sexual harassment of graduate students, stemming from activities going back as far as 2013. He was reprimanded, temporarily relieved of graduate teaching responsibilities, and ordered to undergo sexual harassment prevention training. He was ultimately allowed to continue teaching undergraduate courses.

Books
 
 

For the general public:

References

External links
 
 

21st-century American psychologists
American psychology writers
American male non-fiction writers
George Mason University faculty
University at Buffalo alumni
Cornell University alumni
Living people
Year of birth missing (living people)